The Toro Rosso STR5 was a Formula One motor racing car designed and built by Scuderia Toro Rosso for the  season. The car was a significant change for the team as it represented the first chassis they had indigenously-designed and built on their own; prior to 2010, the car was identical to that of parent team Red Bull Racing, circumventing a ban on customer chassis by having both cars designed by a third party.

The Toro Rosso STR5 utilized the 2009-spec Ferrari 056 V8 engines instead of 2010-spec.

Complete Formula One results
(key) (results in bold indicate pole position; results in italics indicate fastest lap)

 The driver did not finish the Grand Prix, but was classified as he completed over 90% of the race distance.

References

External links

Toro Rosso STR5